Fred Douglas Van Dyke (October 27, 1871 – March 19, 1959) was an American Negro league pitcher in the 1890s.

A native of Vandalia, Michigan, Van Dyke played for the Page Fence Giants in 1895. He later played for the Sam Folz Colored Giants of Kalamazoo, Michigan in 1899. Van Dyke died in Centreville, Michigan in 1959 at age 87.

References

External links
Negro league baseball statistics and player information from Seamheads

1871 births
1959 deaths
Page Fence Giants players
20th-century African-American people